Guy Lusadisu (born 28 December 1982) is a Congolese professional footballer. He last played as a midfielder for AS Vita Club.

In February 2019 he was named as manager of AS Maniema Union.

International career

International goals
Scores and results list DR Congo's goal tally first.

Honours 
AS Vita Club
Winner
 Linafoot: 2014–15

Runner-up
 CAF Champions League: 2014

TP Mazembe
Winner
 Linafoot (2): 2011, 2012
 CAF Champions League (2): 2009, 2010
 CAF Super Cup (2): 2010, 2011

Runner-up
 FIFA Club World Cup: 2010

References

External links 
 

1982 births
Living people
Footballers from Kinshasa
Democratic Republic of the Congo footballers
Democratic Republic of the Congo international footballers
Association football midfielders
Democratic Republic of the Congo expatriate footballers
Expatriate footballers in Tunisia
Democratic Republic of the Congo expatriate sportspeople in Tunisia
Expatriate footballers in Gabon
Democratic Republic of the Congo expatriate sportspeople in Gabon
Expatriate footballers in Rwanda
Democratic Republic of the Congo expatriate sportspeople in Rwanda
SC Cilu players
TP Mazembe players
CS Sfaxien players
APR F.C. players
AS Mangasport players
AS Vita Club players
Democratic Republic of the Congo football managers
21st-century Democratic Republic of the Congo people
2016 African Nations Championship players
Democratic Republic of the Congo A' international footballers